

Medalists

Standings
Men's Competition

References
Complete 1997 Mediterranean Games Standings Archived

1997 in water polo
Sports at the 1997 Mediterranean Games
1997
1997